Dakshin Shahbazpur or South Shahbazpur is a Union Parishad under Barlekha Upazila of Moulvibazar District in the division of Sylhet, Bangladesh. It has an area of 40.46 square miles and a population of 26,840.

History
The South Shahbazpur Upazila is named after its headquarters, the village of South Shahbazpur. Shahbazpur was formerly known as Kauwakona and home to the Jangdar clan, who were the local Hindu zamindars (landlords) located within the Panchakhanda pargana. Shyam Rai Jangdar's son, Swarup Ram Jangdar, Muluk Suwai was buried next to him after his death. introduced a vigraha (idol) site dedicated to Vasudeva located in the Kumar Saeed mauza. However, he later converted to Islam after visiting Delhi to discuss revenue with the emperor. Swarup Ram Jangdar was awarded the name Shahbaz Khan, subsequently establishing the Shahbazpur pargana, separating it from greater Panchakhanda. He later embarked on the Hajj pilgrimage to Mecca. At the age of eighty, Shahbaz Khan had his first and only son, Fateh Muhammad (c. 1700-1790s), who succeeded him as the Zamindar of Shahbazpur. The next zamindar of Shahbazpur was his son, Muhammad Fazil, and then his son, Muhammad Adil. Adil had no sons, and so it was inherited by his daughter, and then his grandson, Abdul Ghafur Chowdhury. Abdul Ghafur's son and successor, Nouman Muqit Chowdhury, was one of the local aristocrats.

The general preeminence of the Jangdar clan is displayed in a proverb recorded by the historians Achyut Charan Choudhury and Syed Murtaza Ali:

Translated, this means "Pal, Prachanda, Jangdar. These are the three mirashdars." Thus, making reference to the Pal family, the descendants of Prachanda Khan and the unrelated Jangdar clan, the proverb states that there were no other mirashdars beyond these families in the locality.

In August 2019, the Indian Border Security Force shot dead Abdus Shakur ibn Muraqib Ali, a South Shahbazpuri resident from Bobartal Majhgandhai.

Administration
The union has roughly 40 villages divided into 9 wards and 14 mouzas.

Demography
South Shahbazpur has a population of 26,840. 12,825 are men and 14,015 of the population are female. There are three graveyards for the deceased residents to be buried and these are Taradorom Central Cemetery, Muraul Central Cemetery and Sujaul Central Cemetery.

Education
The Union has 9 state primary schools and 3 private primary schools. It has 5 high schools and 6 madrasas. The Baragul Qawmi Madrasa is home to an orphanage. Other madrasas include the Sujaul Senior Fazil Madrasha, Taradorom Women's Dakhil Madrasa and the Barlekha Jamia Islamiya Dakhil Madrasa. The literacy rate in the union is 54.3%.

Economy and tourism
South Shahbazpur has three Haat bazaars; Taradorom Bazar, Muraul Bazar and Office Bazar. The Union has a significant number of emigrants in Saudi Arabia, Qatar, UAE, Greece, UK, France, Kuwait, Oman, Bahrain, Brazil, Spain, United States and Italy contributing to its economy. Mohammad Ataul Karim originates from this area. In recent times, coal deposits have been discovered in Bobartal.

Popular tourist sites include its four tea gardens; Shahbazpur, Bahadurpur, Chotolekha and Rahmaniya. The Union is home to 4 sports clubs in Taradorom, Gholsa, Muraul and Sujaul. The practice of Cockfighting competitions which take place in Gholsa School attracts media attention.

Religion
There are 41 mosques in the Union. Some include:
Taradorom Central Mosque, East Taradorom Jame Mosque, Taradorom Choumuhoni Jame Mosque, Taradorom Barathal Jame Mosque, Central Taradorom Panjegana, West Taradorom Jame Masjid
Muraul Jame Mosque, Muraul Panjegana Mosque
East Banikona Jame Mosque, West Banikona Jame Mosque
Bagatikar Jame Mosque
Ghorua Jame Mosque
Bisrabond Jame Mosque, Bisrabond Pakhurgul Masjid
Ulkanti Panjegana
West Panchpara Jame Masjid, East Panchpara Jame Masjid, Central Panchpara Jame Masjid
Sariya Jame Masjid
Office Bazar Jame Masjid
Sujaul Jame Masjid, Sujaul Dingal Jame Masjid
Kayasthashashan Jame Masjid
Shuararthal Jame Masjid, Shuararthal Panjegana of Hannan
Shahbazpur Tea Garden Mosque

There are also 6 eidgahs in the union. These are Taradorom Shahi Eidgah, Muraul Eidgah, Sujaul Shahi Central Eidgah, East Taradorom Mosque Eidgah, Gholsa Shahi Eidgah and Bisrabond Eidgah.

List of chairmen

See also
Divisions of Bangladesh
Districts of Bangladesh
Upazilas of Bangladesh

Notes

References

Unions of Barlekha Upazila